Katherine María Alvarado Aguilar (born 11 April 1991) is a Costa Rican footballer who plays as a midfielder for Deportivo Saprissa and the Costa Rica women's national team.

Honours 
Costa Rica
Winner
 Central American Games: 2013

References

External links
 
 Profile  at Fedefutbol
 

1991 births
Living people
Women's association football midfielders
Costa Rican women's footballers
People from Alajuela Province
Costa Rica women's international footballers
2015 FIFA Women's World Cup players
Pan American Games bronze medalists for Costa Rica
Pan American Games medalists in football
Footballers at the 2019 Pan American Games
Footballers at the 2011 Pan American Games
Footballers at the 2015 Pan American Games
Central American Games gold medalists for Costa Rica
Central American Games medalists in football
Primera División (women) players
RCD Espanyol Femenino players
Costa Rican expatriate footballers
Costa Rican expatriate sportspeople in Colombia
Expatriate women's footballers in Colombia
Costa Rican expatriate sportspeople in Spain
Expatriate women's footballers in Spain
Medalists at the 2019 Pan American Games